This is a list of Northern Colorado Bears football players in the NFL Draft.

Key

Selections

References

Northern Colorado

Northern Colorado Bears NFL Draft